Jean Aubert may refer to:
 Jean Aubert (engineer) (1894–1984), French engineer
 Jean Aubert (architect) (c. 1680–1741), French architect
 Jean-Louis Aubert (born 1955), French musician
 Abbé Aubert (Jean-Louis Aubert, 1731–1814), French dramatist, poet and journalist

See also
 Jeanne Aubert (1906–1988), French singer and actress